This article serves as an index – as complete as possible – of all the honorific orders or similar decorations awarded by Jordan, classified by Monarchies chapter and Republics chapter, and, under each chapter, recipients' countries and the detailed list of recipients.

The Jordanian Orders used in bilateral honorific exchanges during state or official visits are:
 the Order of al-Hussein bin Ali
 the Supreme Order of the Renaissance
 the Order of the Star of Jordan
 the Order of Independence

Awards

Jordanian Royal Family 

 Family of King Hussein and Queen Muna
 Abdullah II of Jordan:
  Grand Master of the Order of al-Hussein bin Ali
  Grand Master of the Supreme Order of the Renaissance
  Grand Master of the Order of the Star of Jordan
  Grand Master of the Order of Independence
 Queen Rania of Jordan
  Grand Cordon with collar of the Order of al-Hussein bin Ali (9.6.1999) 

 Family of King Hussein and Queen Dina
 Princess Alia bint Al Hussein, daughter of Queen Dina of Jordan, half-sister of Abdullah II of Jordan
  Grand Cordon of the Order of the Star of Jordan 
 1st class of Al-Hussein Decoration for Distinguished Contribution (5.2.2007) 

 Family of King Hussein and Queen Alia
 Princess Haya bint Al Hussein, daughter of Queen Alia of Jordan, half-sister of Abdullah II of Jordan
  Special Grand Cordon of the Supreme Order of the Renaissance (30.1.2006) 
 Prince Ali Bin Al-Hussein, Son of Queen Alia of Jordan, half-brother of Abdullah II of Jordan
  Grand Cordon of the Order of al-Hussein bin Ali 
  Grand Cordon of the Supreme Order of the Renaissance
  Grand Cordon of the Order of the Star of Jordan 
  Grand Cordon of the Order of Independence 
 Al Hussein Order of Military Merit 4th class 
 King Hussein Medal of Excellence 
 Medals for Administration & Technical Competence, Administrative & Leadership Competence, Training Competence, etc.
 Princess Rym, Ali's wife
  Grand Cordon of the Order of the Star of Jordan

 Family of King Hussein and Queen Noor of Jordan
 Queen Noor of Jordan
  Grand Cordon  with collar of the Order of al-Hussein bin Ali (5.6.1978) 
  Special Grand Cordon of the Supreme Order of the Renaissance (5.6.1978) 
 Prince Hamzah bin Al Hussein, son of Queen Noor of Jordan, half-brother of Abdullah II of Jordan
  Grand Cordon of the Supreme Order of the Renaissance (November 1995)
  Grand Cordon of the Order of the Star of Jordan (November 1995)
  Grand Cordon of the Order of Independence 
 4th class of the Al-Hussein Order of Military Merit  
 Princess Noor Hamzah, Hamzah's wife
  Grand Cordon of the Order of the Star of Jordan 
 'Prince Hashim Al Hussein, son of Queen Noor of Jordan, half-brother of Abdullah II of Jordan
  Grand Cordon of the Order of the Star of Jordan 
 1st class of the Al-Hussein Order of Military Merit  
 King Hussein Medal of Excellence (10.6.2000)
 Medals for Administrative & Leadership Competence and Administrative & Technical Competence

 King Hussein's siblings and Family
 Prince Muhammad bin Talal, eldest younger brother of King Hussein I of Jordan
  Grand Cordon of the Order of al-Hussein bin Ali w/ Collar 
  Special Grand Cordon of the Supreme Order of the Renaissance 
  Grand Cordon of the Order of the Star of Jordan 
  Grand Cordon of the Order of Independence (Jordan) 
 Long Service and Good Conduct Medal 
 King Hussein Silver Jubilee Medal-1977 
 1967–1971 Service Medal-1971 
 Prince Talal bin Muhammad, elder son of Muhammad bin Talal
  Grand Cordon of the Order of the Star of Jordan 
 Grand Cordon of the Order of Independence (Jordan) 
 Princess Ghida Talal, Talal's wife
  Grand Cordon of the Order of the Star of Jordan 
 Grand Cordon of the Order of Independence (Jordan) 
 Prince Ghazi bin Muhammad, younger son of Muhammad bin Talal
  Grand Cordon of the Supreme Order of the Renaissance (9.10.2003) 
  Grand Cordon of the Order of the Star of Jordan (13.11.1995) 
 Al-Hussein Distinguished Service Medal 1st class (24.8.1999) 
 and Education Medal 1st class (5.10.2004) 
 Prince Hassan bin Talal, youngest brother of King Hussein I of Jordan
  Order of al-Hussein bin Ali (20.3.1987)
  Special Grand Cordon of the Supreme Order of the Renaissance 
  Grand Cordon of the Order of the Star of Jordan 
  Grand Cordon of the Order of Independence (Jordan) 
 King Hussein Silver Jubilee Medal (1977) 
 1967–1971 Service Medal-1971 
 the Great Ramadan War (1973) Medal 
 Princess Sarvath El Hassan, Hassan's wife
  Special Grand Cordon of the Supreme Order of the Renaissance (al-Nahda) (8.1994) 
 Princess Rahma bint El Hassan, Hassan's elder daughter
  Grand Cordon of the Order of Independence (Jordan) 
 Mr.Ala'a Al Batayneh, her husband
  Grand Cordon of the Order of Independence (Jordan) 
 Sayyid Nasser Judeh, Hassan's younger daughter Princess Badiya bint El Hassan's husband
  Grand Cordon of the Order of Independence (Jordan) 
 Prince Rashid bin El Hassan, Hassan's son
 Grand Cordon of the Al-Hussein Order of Military Merit (1996) 
 Al-Hussein Military Medal 1st class (14.11.1996) 
 Medals of Administrative & Leadership Competence, and Administrative and Technical Competence 
 Basma bint Talal, sister of  King Hussein I of Jordan
  Special Grand Cordon of the Supreme Order of the Renaissance (7.1994) 
 Colonel H.E. Timoor al-Daghistani, Basma bint Talal's first husband
  Grand Cordon of the Order of the Star of Jordan

Monarchies 
By observation, the average awarding scheme is mainly the following:
 Grand Cordon with Collar of the Order of al-Hussein bin Ali for the Sovereign
 Grand Cordon of the Supreme Order of the Renaissance for the Sovereign's Consort and the Heir(ess) to the throne.
 Grand Cordon of the Order of the Star of Jordan for non-heir prince and princess
 Grand Cordon of the Order of Independence for the husband of a non-heiress princess.

Exceptions may occur if the Jordanian Sovereign wants to honour more one prince or princess, or due to some reciprocity to the partner state's honorific system. Mainly, a non-heir prince and princess may receive the Supreme Order of the Renaissance rather than the Order of the Star of Jordan.

European monarchies

British Royal Family 

 The Queen: 19531984 -  Member with Collar - 1984 - Member with Sash - of the Order of Hussein ibn' Ali
 The Duke of Kent: Grand Cordon of the Supreme Order of the Renaissance

Norwegian Royal Family 

 Harald V of Norway: Grand Cordon with Collar of the Order of al-Hussein bin Ali °
 Queen Sonja of Norway: Grand Cordon of the Supreme Order of the Renaissance° (Order of Al-Nahda)
 Haakon, Crown Prince of Norway: Grand Cordon of the Supreme Order of the Renaissance ° (Order of Al-Nahda)
 Princess Märtha Louise of Norway: Grand Cordon of the Order of the Star of Jordan ° (Order of Al-Kawkab Al Urdoni)
 Princess Astrid of Norway: Grand Cordon of the Order of the Star of Jordan ° (Al-Kawkab Al Urdoni)

Swedish Royal Family 

 Carl XVI Gustaf of Sweden: Collar of the Order of al-Hussein bin Ali (1989)
 Queen Silvia of Sweden: Grand Cordon of the Supreme Order of the Renaissance (1989)
 Victoria, Crown Princess of Sweden: Grand Cordon of the Supreme Order of the Renaissance (2003)
 Prince Carl Philip, Duke of Värmland (2003): Grand Cordon of the Order of the Star of Jordan (2003)
 Princess Madeleine, Duchess of Hälsingland and Gästrikland: Grand Cordon of the Order of the Star of Jordan

Danish Royal Family 

 Margrethe II of Denmark: Collar of the Order of the Star of Jordan
 Frederik, Crown Prince of Denmark: Grand Cordon of the Supreme Order of the Renaissance
 Prince Joachim of Denmark: Grand Cordon of the Supreme Order of the Renaissance

Dutch Royal Family 

 Princess Beatrix of the Netherlands
 Collar of the Order of the Star of Jordan
 Grand Cordon of the Supreme Order of the Renaissance
 Prince Constantijn of the Netherlands: Grand Cordon of the Supreme Order of the Renaissance
 Princess Laurentien of the Netherlands: Grand Cordon of the Supreme Order of the Renaissance
 Princess Margriet of the Netherlands: Grand Cordon of the Supreme Order of the Renaissance
 Pieter van Vollenhoven: Grand Cordon of the Supreme Order of the Renaissance

Belgian Royal Family 

 King Philippe: Knight Grand Cordon with Collar of the Order of al-Hussein bin Ali (18 May 2016)
 Queen Mathilde: Dame Gran Cordon of the Supreme Order of the Renaissance (18 May 2016)

Spanish Royal Family 

 Juan Carlos I of Spain: Collar of the Order of al-Hussein bin Ali (1985)
 Queen Sofía of Spain 
 Grand Cordon of the Order of the Star of Jordan (1985)
 Grand Cordon of the Supreme Order of the Renaissance (1999)
 Felipe, Prince of Asturias: Grand Cordon of the Supreme Order of the Renaissance (1999)
 Infanta Elena, Duchess of Lugo: Grand Cordon of the Order of the Star of Jordan (1999)
 Jaime de Marichalar: Grand Cordon of the Order of Independence (1999)

Monegasque Princely Family 

 Albert II, Prince of Monaco: Grand Cordon of the Supreme Order of the Renaissance (before 07/2011)

Asian monarchies

Bruneian Royal Family 

They have been awarded:

 Hassanal Bolkiah: Order of al-Hussein bin Ali (19.12.1984)
 Queen Saleha: Grand Cordon Special Class  of the Supreme Order of the Renaissance (13.5.2008)
 Hajah Mariam binti Haji ‘Abdu’l Aziz, Sultan's second (divorced) wife: Grand Cordon Special Class of the Supreme Order of the Renaissance (19.12.1984)
 Azrinaz Mazhar binti Hakim Mazhar, Sultan's third (divorced) wife: Grand Cordon Special Class of the Supreme Order of the Renaissance (13.5.2008)
 Al-Muhtadee Billah, Crown Prince of Brunei: Grand Cordon Special class of the Supreme Order of the Renaissance (13.5.2008)
 Pengiran Anak Sarah, Crown Princess of Brunei: Grand Cordon Special class of the Supreme Order of the Renaissance (13.5.2008)
 Rashida, Sultan's elder daughter: Grand Cordon Special class of the Supreme Order of the Renaissance (13.5.2008)

Japanese Imperial Family 

 Emperor Akihito: Collar of the Order of al-Hussein bin Ali

Arab monarchies

House of Saud

 Salman of Saudi Arabia
 Sultan bin Salman Al Saud

Former monarchies

Republics

See also 
 List of honours of the Jordanian Royal Family by country

References 

 
Jordan